Shell River may refer to:

Rivers
Shell River (Minnesota)
Shell River (Saskatchewan)
Shell River (Assiniboine River tributary)
Musselshell River, Montana, also known as Shell River

Places
Rural Municipality of Shell River
Shell River Township, Minnesota